Magallanes may refer to:
 Ferdinand Magellan (1480–1521), Portuguese explorer who led part of the first expedition around the world
 Strait of Magellan, the strait between the Pacific and Atlantic Oceans, located in Chile

Places
 Magallanes Department, Santa Cruz Province in Argentina
 Magallanes y la Antártica Chilena Region in Chile
 Magallanes Province, within this region
 Magallanes, the official name of the Chilean city of Punta Arenas between 1927 and 1938 
 Magallanes, Agusan del Norte in the Philippines
 Magallanes, Cavite in the Philippines
 Magallanes, Sorsogon in the Philippines
 Magallanes Interchange in the Philippines
 Magallanes station in the Philippines
 Magallanes Village in the Philippines

Other uses
 Magallanes (surname)
 Magallanes (film), a 2014 Peruvian film
 Chilean corvette Magallanes (1873)
 Universidad de Magallanes in the Magallanes Region in Chile
 Deportes Magallanes, a football club from Chile
 Navegantes del Magallanes, a baseball club from Venezuela
 , a rebrand of the Classmate PC laptop for distribution in Latin languages countries
 Ovejero magallánico, a dog originated in Chile

See also
 Magellan (disambiguation)